Thiram is the simplest thiuram disulfide and the oxidized dimer of dimethyldithiocarbamate. It is used as a fungicide, ectoparasiticide to prevent fungal diseases in seed and crops and similarly as an animal repellent to protect fruit trees and ornamentals from damage by rabbits, rodents and deer.  It is effective against Stem gall of coriander, damping off, smut of millet, neck rot of onion, etc. Thiram has been used in the treatment of human scabies, as a sun screen and as a bactericide applied directly to the skin or incorporated into soap.

Thiram is also used as a sulfur source and secondary accelerator the sulfur vulcanization of rubbers.

Usage 

Thiram was traditionally used in apple and wine farming. Since 2010 most thiram is applied to soybeans.

Chemical properties
Thiram is a type of sulfur fungicide. It has been found to dissolve completely in chloroform, acetone, and ether. It is available as dust, flowable, wettable powder, water-dispersible granules, and water suspension formulations and in mixtures with other fungicides.

Thiram is nearly immobile in clay soils or in soils of high organic matter. It is not expected to contaminate groundwater because of its in-soil half life of 15 days, in addition to its tendency to adhere to soil particles.

As a waste, thiram carries an EPA U244 code.

Toxicity
Thiram is moderately toxic by ingestion, but it is highly toxic if inhaled. Acute exposure in humans may cause headaches, dizziness, fatigue, nausea, diarrhea, and other gastrointestinal complaints.

Chronic or repeated exposure may cause sensitive skin, and it may have effects on the thyroid or liver.

References

External links

Thiuram disulfides